Sindong station is a railway station on the Gyeongbu Line.

Railway stations in North Gyeongsang Province